The Catholic Diocese of Pensacola–Tallahassee is a diocese in the Province of Miami, both in the U.S. state of Florida. The patron saint of the diocese is St. Michael the Archangel.

Main churches 

The episcopal see is the Cathedral of the Sacred Heart, in Pensacola, which city also has a Minor Basilica: Basilica of St. Michael the Archangel.

There is also a co-cathedral, the Co-Cathedral of Saint Thomas More, in Tallahassee

Statistics 
As of 2023, the diocese pastorally served 63,834 Catholics (4.1% of 1,438,000 total)  on 36,724 km² in 49 parishes and 6 missions with 67 priests (53 diocesan, 14 religious), 64 deacons, 22 lay religious (8 brothers, 15 sisters), 18 seminarians.

History 
The diocese was formed on 1 October 1975 with territories split off from the diocese of St. Augustine and the then–diocese of Mobile (now archdiocese).

Bishops of Pensacola–Tallahassee
The list of bishops of the diocese and their years of service:
 René Henry Gracida (1975-1983), appointed Bishop of Corpus Christi
 Joseph Keith Symons (1983-1990), appointed Bishop of Palm Beach
 John Mortimer Smith (1991-1995), appointed Coadjutor Bishop and later Bishop of Trenton
 John Huston Ricard, S.S.J. (1997-2011)
 Gregory Lawrence Parkes (2012-2016), appointed Bishop of Saint Petersburg
 William Albert Wack, C.S.C. (2017–present)

Other priests from the diocese who became bishops
 Martin Holley, appointed Auxiliary Bishop of Washington in 2004 and later Bishop of Memphis

Catholic high schools 
 John Paul II Catholic High School, Tallahassee
 Pensacola Catholic High School, Pensacola

See also 
 List of the Catholic dioceses of the United States
 Catholic Church in the United States
 Catholic Church hierarchy

References

Sources and external links 
 GCatholic, with Google map & satellite photo - data for most sections
Roman Catholic Diocese of Pensacola–Tallahassee Official Site

 
Roman Catholic dioceses in the United States
Christian organizations established in 1975
Roman Catholic dioceses and prelatures established in the 20th century
1975 establishments in Florida